Bradley Cachopa (born 8 August 1988) is a South African-born New Zealand cricketer who plays domestically for Auckland (and previously also for Canterbury).

Biography 
He was born in Bloemfontein, in what is now South Africa's Free State province, and represented the Free State cricket team at under-13 level. His family emigrated to New Zealand in 2002, and he and two brothers, Carl (born 1986) and Craig Cachopa (born 1992), have each since played first-class cricket in New Zealand. A right-handed batsman and occasional wicket-keeper, Brad Cachopa represented the New Zealand under-19s when the Indian under-19s toured during the 2006–07 season, playing three under-19 Tests and three under-19 ODIs. He made his first-class debut for Auckland during the 2010–11 season of the Plunket Shield, also featuring in that season's HRV Cup, New Zealand's domestic Twenty20 competition. Cachopa switched to Canterbury for the 2012–13 season, but returned to Auckland prior to the 2014–15 season, after two seasons at Canterbury. His older brother, Carl, also signed with Auckland, having previously played for Central Districts.

References

External links

1988 births
Auckland cricketers
Canterbury cricketers
Living people
New Zealand cricketers
New Zealand people of Portuguese descent
People from Bloemfontein
South African emigrants to New Zealand
Naturalised citizens of New Zealand
Massey University alumni